Zapatilla (also known as La Zapatilla) is a Spanish peak in the Pyrenees mountain range.

Location 
It is located on the Spanish side of the French border, near the Candanchú ski resort. Aspe is located adjacent to Zapatilla.

The peak's La Zapatilla tube, an incline of 35º, is known for providing an extreme challenge to professional skiers and snowboarders.

Gallery

References 

Mountains of the Pyrenees